John Stuart, 12th Earl of Moray (25 January 1797 – 8 November 1867), styled The Honourable John Stuart between 1810 and 1859, was a Scottish soldier and politician.

Background
Moray was a younger son of Francis Stuart, 10th Earl of Moray, and Lucy, daughter of Major-General John Scott.

Career
Moray was a captain in the British Army and also sat as member of parliament for Newport from 1825 to 1826. In 1859 he succeeded his elder brother in the earldom and entered the House of Lords.

Personal life
Lord Moray died in November 1867, aged 70. He never married and was succeeded in the earldom by his half-brother, Archibald Stuart.

References

External links

1797 births
1867 deaths
Earls of Moray
British Army officers
Members of the Parliament of the United Kingdom for English constituencies
Members of Parliament for Newport (Isle of Wight)
UK MPs 1820–1826
UK MPs who inherited peerages